Karunagappally State assembly constituency is one of the 140 state legislative assembly constituencies in Kerala state in southern India. It is also one of the 7 state legislative assembly constituencies included in the Alappuzha Lok Sabha constituency. As of the 2021 assembly elections, the current MLA is C. R. Mahesh of Indian National Congress.

Structure
Karunagappally assembly constituency was formed in 1951. As per the recent changes on assembly constituency delimitations, the assembly constituency consists of Karunagappally municipality and 6 panchayaths from Karunagappally Taluk including Alappad, Clappana, Kulasekharapuram, Oachira, Thazhava and Thodiyoor.

Major institutions in the constituency
 Municipality: 1 Karunagappally
 Panchayaths: 6 (Alappad, Clappana, Kulasekharapuram, Oachira, Thazhava and Thodiyoor)
 Railway Stations: 2 (Karunagappalli, Oachira)
 Government Hospitals: 4 (Chest Disease Hospital(TB) in Karunagappally, Govt. Taluk Hospital in Karunagappally, Community Health Center in Mynagapally, Community Health Center in Ochira)

Members of Legislative Assembly 
The following list contains all members of Kerala legislative assembly who have represented the constituency:

Key

Election results 
Percentage change (±%) denotes the change in the number of votes from the immediate previous election.

Niyamasabha Election 2021 
There were 2,13,993 registered voters in the constituency for the 2021 Kerala Niyamasabha Election

Niyamasabha Election 2016 
There were 2,04,539 registered voters in the constituency for the 2016 Kerala Niyamasabha Election.

Niyamasabha Election 2011 
There were 1,82,508 registered voters in the constituency for the 2011 election.

References 

Assembly constituencies of Kerala
Government of Kollam
Politics of Kollam district
Assembly constituencies in Kollam district
1957 establishments in Kerala
Constituencies established in 1957